The 2021 FIFA Club World Cup (officially known as the FIFA Club World Cup UAE 2021 presented by Alibaba Cloud for sponsorship reasons) was the 18th edition of the FIFA Club World Cup, a FIFA-organised international club football tournament between the winners of the six continental confederations, as well as the host nation's league champions. The tournament was held from 3 to 12 February 2022 in the United Arab Emirates.

Defending champions Bayern Munich did not qualify as they were eliminated in the quarter-finals of the 2020–21 UEFA Champions League. The eventual winners of that competition, Chelsea, won the Club World Cup for the first time, beating Al-Hilal of Saudi Arabia 1–0 in the semi-finals before requiring extra time to claim a 2–1 win over Brazilian side Palmeiras in the final.

Host appointment
An expanded Club World Cup in China was planned to be held in June and July 2021. However, due to fixture congestion caused by the postponement of the 2020 Summer Olympics and the impact of the COVID-19 pandemic on football, the Tokyo Olympics, UEFA European Championship and Copa América were postponed from mid-2020 to mid-2021. As a result, FIFA announced in March 2020 that they would postpone the expanded Club World Cup to later in 2021, 2022 or 2023, before cancelling it entirely.

On 4 December 2020, the FIFA Council announced that the Club World Cup, using the previous format, would be held in late 2021 and hosted by Japan. However, on 8 September 2021, the Japan Football Association dropped its commitment to host the tournament, owing to the possibility of restrictions on fan attendance due to the COVID-19 pandemic in Japan. Numerous countries expressed interest in hosting the tournament as bidding was reopened, including Brazil, Egypt, Qatar, Saudi Arabia, South Africa, and the United Arab Emirates. On 20 October 2021, the FIFA Council named the United Arab Emirates as the host of the tournament, and postponed the event from late 2021 to early 2022.

Qualified teams

Notes

Venues
The matches were played at two venues in the city of Abu Dhabi, both of which hosted matches at the 2019 AFC Asian Cup.

Match officials
Five referees, ten assistant referees, and seven video assistant referees were appointed for the tournament.

One support referee was also named for the tournament.

Semi-automated offside technology was tested during the tournament.

Squads

Each team named a 23-man squad (three of whom had to be goalkeepers). Injury replacements were allowed until 24 hours before the team's first match.

Matches
The draw of the tournament was held on 29 November 2021, 17:00 CET (UTC+1), at the FIFA headquarters in Zürich, Switzerland, to decide the matchups of the second round (between the first round winner and teams from AFC, CAF and CONCACAF), and the opponents of the two second round winners in the semi-finals (against teams from CONMEBOL and UEFA).

If a match was tied after normal playing time:
For elimination matches, extra time was played. If still tied after extra time, a penalty shoot-out was held to determine the winner.
For the matches for fifth place and third place, no extra time was played, and a penalty shoot-out was held to determine the winner.
 

All times are local, GST (UTC+4).

First round

Second round

Semi-finals

Match for fifth place

Match for third place

Final

Goalscorers

1 own goal
 Mohammed Rabii (Al-Jazira, against AS Pirae)
 Zayed Sultan (Al-Jazira, against Monterrey)

Awards

The following awards were given at the conclusion of the tournament. Thiago Silva of Chelsea won the Golden Ball award, sponsored by Adidas, which is jointly awarded with the Alibaba Cloud Award to recognise the player of the tournament.

FIFA also named a man of the match for the best player in each game at the tournament.

References

External links

2021 FIFA Club World Cup
2021
2021 in association football
2022 in association football
2021 Fifa Club World Cup
2021–22 in Emirati football
February 2022 sports events in the United Arab Emirates
Association football events postponed due to the COVID-19 pandemic